Horná Breznica is a village and municipality in Púchov District in the Trenčín Region of north-western Slovakia.

History
In historical records the village was first mentioned in 1388.

Geography
The municipality lies at an altitude of 297 metres (974 ft) and covers an area of 12.276 km² (4.74 mi²). It has a population of about 455 people.

Genealogical resources
The records for genealogical research are available at the state archive "Statny Archiv in Bytca, Slovakia"
 Roman Catholic church records (births/marriages/deaths): 1714-1896 (parish B)

See also
 List of municipalities and towns in Slovakia

References

External links
 
 
Surnames of living people in Horna Breznica

Villages and municipalities in Púchov District